The C.S. Golden House, also known as the Leonard and Ellie Crain House, is a historic house located in Thomaston, Alabama. It was built in 1898 in the Queen Anne style.  The house was added to the National Register of Historic Places on August 31, 2000, due to its architectural significance.

References

National Register of Historic Places in Marengo County, Alabama
Houses on the National Register of Historic Places in Alabama
Queen Anne architecture in Alabama
Houses completed in 1898
Houses in Marengo County, Alabama
1898 establishments in Alabama